Klyuchiki is a rural locality (a selo) in Bolshesazansky Selsoviet of Seryshevsky District, Amur Oblast, Russia. The population was 166 as of 2018. There are 4 streets.

Geography 
Klyuchiki is located on the Zeya River, 28 km north of Seryshevo (the district's administrative centre) by road. Ozyornoye is the nearest rural locality.

References 

Rural localities in Seryshevsky District